The Sehon Goodridge Theological Society is an ecumenical Christian and education organization established in 2008. The Society is headquartered in Trinidad and Tobago and is named in honor of the late Sehon Goodridge former Anglican Archbishop of the Windward Islands.

History 
The Society initially began as the Trinidad and Tobago branch of the Codrington College Diploma of Theological Studies Program.  This external diploma, which was an initiative of Goodridge and was designed primarily for lay persons in leadership positions of Christian Churches and had been carried on in Trinidad since the mid-seventies  After Goodridge's death in 2007 members of the Diploma in Theology programme obtained permission from his widow, Janet, to set up The Sehon Goodridge Theological Society as an Interdenominational organization to promote theological research and study and Interfaith dialogue.

Activities 
The main actives of the society include
 The Diploma in Theological Studies (offered in Conjunction with Codrington College)
 An Annual Service for Justice and Peace an annual interfaith service includes the clergy and laity of different faiths
 The annual Sehon Goodridge Commemorative Lecture. A public lecture to commemorate the theological legacy of Sehon Goodridge. The lecture has been delivered by a number of prominent Caribbean Theologians including:
 Reverend Dr. Marcus Lashley, Anglican Minister and Psychologist - 2012
 Clyde Martin Harvey - Romand Catholic Bishop of Grenada - 2016
 Rev. Michael Clark, Principal of Codrington College - 2015
 Publication of an online journal called The Journal of Caribbean Christian Action
 Retreats, quiet days and discussion series

Notable members 
 Knolly Clarke - Chairman and Academic Dean - Retired Dean, Holy Trinity Cathedral, Port of Spain
Paula Henry - Chair of HaiT&T Foundation

References

External links 

Nondenominational Christian societies and communities
Christian ecumenical organizations
Interfaith organizations
Religion in Trinidad and Tobago